Chengamanadu is an Indian village in Kollam District of Kerala state.

Etymology
An age old legend about the origin of the name Chengamanadu goes like this: A prince of the then Desinganadu Kingdom went to Arabia and fallen in love with an Arabian beauty. He managed to elope with her back to his home land. But the girl's father traced their location and followed them to take her back. Knowing his arrival the lovers decided to leave the place and started off to Tamil Nadu via Aryankavu route in a single bullock ridden cart. On their way when they reached our place it was becoming heavily dark and the area was then a dense forest. There they met one woman named "Nangamma", she gave them refuge in her house to spend the night. The next day morning they continued their journey. After a long time the Prince has returned to meet Nengamma who has given him shelter, but could not meet her. Through the Prince, the forest land of Nangamma came to be known as "Nangammakadu" and later in the current form Chengamanadu.

Chengamanadu is located 5 km from Kottarakara. Bethlahem Ashram, "Villoorpally" and Vettikkavala Sree Mahadevar Temple, Assembly of God Church are some of the places of worship. A panchayathu office, village office, agricultural office, veterinary hospital, mini-stadium, YMCA, and a hospital are situated at heart of Chengamanadu.

Offices

Panchayathu office
Village office
Krishi Bhavan 
Veterinery hospital
YMCA
Y's Men's Chengamanadu Town Club

Educational institutions
MTMM LP School
Chethady UPS
MAMHS
B R M Central School
Mar Pelexinous Memorial ITC
Govt Model Higher Secondary School

Churches and temples

 St. Mary's Orthodox Syrian Church [Villoorpally]-Villoor, Chengamanadu
 Assembly of God Church, Chengamanadu
 Vettikavala Sree Mahadevar Temple

Nearest cities and towns

 Kottarakara - 5 km
 Kollam - 32 km
 Punalur - 12 km

Industries
CAPEX Cashew Factory
Cashew Factory of Cashew Development Corporation

See also

Kottarakkara

References

Further reading
 "Kottarakkara Taluk". Kollam; National Informatics centre. Retrieved 22 February 2011.
 "History". kottarakkara.com. Retrieved 23 February 2011.
 Parankamveettil, 129. . Retrieved 23 February 2011
 "District Information". Kollam: National Informatics Centre. Retrieved 22 February 2011.
 K. Ayyappapanicker; Sahitya Akademi (1997). Medieval Indian literature: an anthology. Sahitya Akademi. pp. 317–. . Retrieved 23 February 2011.

Villages in Kollam district